Slavne is a village in Marinka Raion (district) in Donetsk Oblast of eastern Ukraine, at 32.8 km SW from the centre of Donetsk city.

Demographics
The settlement had 237 inhabitants in 2001; native language distribution as of the Ukrainian Census of 2001:
Ukrainian: 45.57%
Russian: 54.43%

References

Villages in Kalmiuske Raion